Marcela Fernández Violante (born June 9, 1941) is a Mexican filmmaker and director. She is a graduate of the University Centre for Cinematographic Studies (CUEC), where she specialized in scripting and direction. Upon graduation from CUEC, Violante participated in the documentary about Mexican artist Frida Kahlo, which won an Ariel Award for “Best Documentary".

Early life  

Violante participated as a student in the filming of the documentary El grito (the scream), by director Leobardo López Aretche on the events that culminate the tragedy of the events that happened in Tlatelolco on October 2nd, 1968. On October 2nd, 2018, it was announced that a remastered version of this film would be shown at FICM.

Career

Frida Kahlo documentary 
Violante participated in making the documentary Frida Kahlo  based on the work of the Mexican painter. She was the first woman to address the topic of Frida Kahlo . This documentary won the Silver Goddess Award and an Ariel award for best debut opera, as well as the prize for the best short film at the Guadalajara film festival in 1973. It won the special jury prize at the London festival in 1974, and was exhibited at the Solomon R. Guggenheim Museum in New York later that year. In 1974, Violante began filming De todos modos Juan te llamas (Anyway, Juan is your name), the first feature film to be produced by UNAM. The film deals with the topic of the Cristero War in the Mexican Shoal in 1927, and the consolidation of the PRI as the ruling party.

Under the policy of freedom of expression in cinema, president Luis Echeverría agreed that the film could be commercially exhibited even though it severely criticized the Catholic Church and the Mexican Army. The film appeared at an exhibition in a New York film festival in 1976 and at the Havana film festival later in December.

1974 - 2019 Back to CUEC 
In 1974, Violante became a professor of scriptwriting and filmmaking subjects of CUEC. She became a director there from 1984 to 1988. According to El Universal, in 1980 she expelled Alfonso Cuarón from CUEC, finding his documentary Vengeance is mine to be pretentious. Violante collaborated as a speaker at universities such Loyola in New Orleans, UCLA in California and NYU in New York. She is the General Secretary of the Union of Film Production Workers of the Mexican Republic (STPC), a member of the General Society of Writers of Mexico (SOGEM), and President of the Matilde Landeta cultural association.

Filmography 

 La Pelota (fiction short film)
 La Perse (fiction short film)
 Gayoso gives discounts (fiction short film)
 Frida Kahlo (documentary short film) 1972
 Anyway, Juan is your name (1974)
 Cananea (1976)
 Mystery (1980)
 In the country of light feet ( The Rarámuri child ) (1981)
 Matilde Landeta, pioneer of the national cinema Television program (1982)
 Nocturnal love you leave (1987)
 Lucky Strike (1992)
 Entangling shadows (episode "Present body", 1998)
 Harassed (2002)

Further reading 

Kuhn, Annette and Susannah Radstone (Edit.) (1990). Women in Film: An International Guide. New York: Fawcett Columbine, p.300. .
 Trelles Plazaola, Luis (1991). Cinema and women in Latin America: Director of fiction films. Río Piedras, Puerto Rico: Editorial of the University of Puerto Rico. .
 Ayala Blanco, Jorge (1986). The condition of Mexican cinema. Mexico: Editorial * Posada. 
 Ciuk, Pearl (2000). Dictionary of directors of Mexican cinema. Mexico: * National Council for Culture and the Arts (CONACULTA) and Cineteca Nacional.

References

External links 

 
 
 
 
 

 

1941 births
Living people
Mexican filmmakers